Judith K. Whitmer is an American political executive serving as the chair of the Nevada Democratic Party. Whitmer was elected on March 6, 2021 by members of the party's governing members, defeating Tick Segerblom in a 248-216 vote. She lost re-election to 	"unity candidate" Daniele Monroe-Moreno in a 314-99 vote.

Education 
Whitmer earned a Bachelor of Arts degree from the Seminole State College of Florida.

Career 
Whitmer was a volunteer on Barack Obama's 2008 and 2012 campaigns. She also worked on the campaign of Martin O'Malley and for various members of the Nevada Legislature. Whitmer has stated that the Bernie Sanders 2016 presidential campaign led her to become involved in party politics. She was a Sanders delegate in 2020.

Whitmer was elected chair of the Nevada Democratic Party along with a new slate of party leaders, all affiliated with the Democratic Socialists of America. Upon her election, the entire staff of the party resigned from their positions in protest.

References 

21st-century American women politicians
Living people
Members of the Democratic Socialists of America
Nevada Democrats
Seminole State College of Florida alumni
State political party chairs of Nevada
Women in Nevada politics
Year of birth missing (living people)